A masturbation booth (masturbation pop-up or pleasure booth) is a small structure intended to allow people to masturbate. It is designed either to offer privacy to those wishing relief, or equipped with a masturbatory aid. One of the first such structures, inspired by the sex-toy company Hot Octopuss, was introduced on Fifth Avenue in Manhattan, New York, after a Time Out survey revealed that 39% of Americans masturbated while at work.

References

Street furniture
Masturbation